Haskel Greenfield (born 1953) is an American archaeologist with a Balkan and Mid-East areal specialization within a general focus on cultural history.  Greenfield was born in Newark, New Jersey.

Biography

Haskel Greenfield was born in Newark, New Jersey in 1953. He turned a childhood interest in ancient history and dinosaurs into his profession by getting his doctorate in anthropology from the City University of New York (1985) after a B.A. (1975) and an M.A. (1980) from Hunter College.  His first professional position was at Indiana University in Bloomington, Indiana. In 1989, he began working at the University of Manitoba in Canada.

In 2015 Greenfield was designated a "Distinguished Professor" by the University of Manitoba.

He is married to the archaeologist Tina Jongsma-Greenfield.

Professional characterization

He characterizes himself in this way: "I am an anthropological archaeologist specializing in the evolution of Old World societies, from the beginning of early farming to the development of states and empires.

"Regionally, my research centers on a transect of countries extending from Europe (Serbia, Bosnia, Macedonia, Hungary, Poland and Romania), through the Near East (Israel, Jordan and Turkey), down to South Africa."  He is well known in the zooarchaeological community.

Publications

In addition to the 2006 book The Origins of Transhumant Pastoralism in Temperate Southeastern Europe: A Zooarchaeological Perspective from the Central Balkans, he has published over seventy academic articles.

References

1953 births
Living people
American archaeologists
City University of New York alumni
Hunter College alumni
Academic staff of the University of Manitoba